Dariusz Lucjan Szlachetko (born 1961) is a Polish botanist and orchidologist.

Publications
 Garaya D.L. Szlachetko in Polish Bot. Stud., 5: 4 (1993). Schiedeella schlechteriana D.L. Szlachetko & C.J. Sheviak in Rhodora, 92(869): 11 (1990).
 "Systema orchidalium". In: Fragmenta Floristica et Geobotanica Polonica 3:1–152 (1995).

Botanical author abbreviation

References

20th-century Polish botanists
Orchidologists
1961 births
Living people
Botanists with author abbreviations
21st-century Polish botanists